Sherwood Stewart and Ferdi Taygan were the defending champions but they competed with different partners that year, Stewart with Mark Edmondson and Taygan with Cássio Motta.

Motta and Taygan lost in the semifinals to Eric Fromm and Drew Gitlin.

Stewart and Edmondson won in the final 7–6, 6–1 against Fromm and Gitlin.

Seeds
Champion seeds are indicated in bold text while text in italics indicates the round in which those seeds were eliminated. The top four seeded teams received byes into the second round.

Draw

Finals

Top half

Bottom half

External links
 1983 Volvo International Doubles draw

Doubles